Akin is an Australian world fusion band. Their album Undercurrent was nominated for 2001 ARIA Award for Best World Music Album. They have toured Australia performing at festivals such as Port Fairy Folk, Melbourne Festival, Sydney Festival, National Folk Festival, Fairbridge Festival, Victor Harbour Folk Festival, and Woodford Folk Festival.

Members
 Jenny Thomas
 Jason Day
 Glen Kniebeiss
 Chris Sprague

Discography

Albums

Awards and nominations

ARIA Music Awards
The ARIA Music Awards is an annual awards ceremony that recognises excellence, innovation, and achievement across all genres of Australian music. They commenced in 1987.

! 
|-
| 2001
| Undercurrent
| ARIA Award for Best World Music Album
| 
| 
|-

References

Australian world music groups